Tim Dieng might refer to:

Timothée Dieng, French footballer
Timothy Dieng, Swiss-Senegalese footballer